Paulo Sousa (born 1970) is a Portuguese footballer and coach.

Paulo Sousa may also refer to:

 Paulo Sousa (singer) (born 1992), Portuguese singer-songwriter and YouTuber
 Paulo Sousa (footballer, born 1967), Portuguese footballer
 Paulo Sousa (footballer, born 1975), Portuguese footballer
 Paulo Sousa (footballer, born 1980), Portuguese footballer

See also
 Paulo Souza (disambiguation)